Sceloporus merriami annulatus, commonly known as the Big Bend canyon lizard, is a subspecies of the canyon lizard, and is endemic to southwestern Texas and adjacent northeastern Mexico.

Etymology
The subspecific name, annulatus, comes from the Latin noun annulus, meaning "ring", and refers to the banded subcaudal surface. This banding is one of the key characteristics to differentiate this subspecies from the nominotypical subspecies, Sceloporus merriami merriami.

Geographic range
S. m. annulatus is native to a fairly narrow range from the Big Bend region of the US state of Texas, to eastern Coahuila in Mexico.

The holotype was collected by Edward Harrison Taylor and J.S. Wright in August 1931 in the Chisos Mountains of Brewster County, Texas.

Description 
The Big Bend canyon lizard is a medium-sized lizard, growing from 4.5 to 6.25 inches (11.5–16 cm) in total length. Its coloration varies with its choice of habitat, varying from grey to reddish, with two rows of dark spots down each side of the back and a dark line on the shoulder region. It has a fairly large head for its body size, and a dewlap which is larger in males than females. Males also have distinct blue patches on either side of the belly.

In this subspecies there are fewer than 53 dorsal scales from the interparietal scale to the base of the tail.

Behavior 
All canyon lizards are diurnal and insectivorous. Their primary choice of habitat is rocky, unvegetated canyon lands with numerous crevices to hide in, and ledges to bask on.

Reproduction
They are oviparous.

References

Further reading
 Smith, H.M. 1937. A New Subspecies of the Lizard Genus Sceloporus from Texas. Proc. Biol. Soc. Washington 50: 83–86. (Sceloporus merriami annulatus, subsp. n.)

External links

Herps of Texas: Sceloporus merriami
An Annotated List of the Species-Group Names Applied to the Lizard Genus Sceloporus - PDF

Sceloporus